Antonio Salandra (13 August 1853 – 9 December 1931) was a conservative Italian politician who served as the 21st prime minister of Italy between 1914 and 1916. He ensured the entry of Italy in World War I on the side of the Triple Entente (the United Kingdom, France, and the Russian Empire) to fulfil Italy’s irredentist claims.

Early life and political career
Born in Troia (Province of Foggia, Apulia), he graduated from the University of Naples in 1875 and then became instructor and later professor of administrative law at the University of Rome.

He was Minister of Agriculture (1899–1900) in the conservative government of Luigi Pelloux and subsequently Minister of the Treasury (1906) and Italian Minister of Finance (1909–1910) in the governments of Sidney Sonnino.

Prime Minister
In March 1914, the conservative Salandra was brought into the national cabinet upon the fall of the government of Giovanni Giolitti, as the choice of Giolitti himself, who still commanded the support of most Italian parliamentarians. Salandra's government was the most conservative one that Italy had seen for a long time. Salandra soon fell out with Giolitti over the question of Italian participation in World War I.

At the outbreak of World War I in August 1914, Salandra declared that Italy would not commit its troops, maintaining that the Triple Alliance had only a defensive stance and Austria-Hungary had been the aggressor. In reality, both Salandra and his ministers of Foreign Affairs, Antonino Paternò Castello, who was succeeded by Sidney Sonnino in November 1914, began to probe which side would grant the best reward for Italy's entrance in the war and to fulfil Italy’s irredentist claims.

Entering World War I

Salandra used the term "sacred egoism" (sacro egoismo) to define Italy's outlook on which side Italy would enter the war. Expecting the war would be short – over by the late summer of 1915 – there was some pressure on the decision to make.

Negotiations had been started between Sonnino, the British Foreign Secretary Edward Grey and the French Foreign Minister Jules Cambon.

The secret pact, the Treaty of London or London Pact, was signed between the Triple Entente (the United Kingdom, France, and the Russian Empire) and the Kingdom of Italy. According to the pact, Italy was to leave the Triple Alliance and join the Triple Entente. Italy was to declare war against Germany and Austria-Hungary within a month in return for territorial concessions at the end of the war.

While Giolitti supported neutrality, Salandra and Sonnino, supported intervention on the side of the Allies, and secured Italy's entrance into the war despite the opposition of the majority in parliament. On 3 May 1915, Italy officially revoked the Triple Alliance. In the following days Giolitti and the neutralist majority of the Parliament opposed declaring war, while nationalist crowds demonstrated in public areas for entering the war. On 13 May 1915, Salandra offered his resignation, but Giolitti, fearful of nationalist disorder that might break into open rebellion, declined to succeed him as prime minister and Salandra's resignation was not accepted.
 
On 23 May 1915, Italy declared war on Austria-Hungary. Salandra had expected that Italy's entrance on the allied side would bring the war to a quick solution, but in fact it changed little, and Italy's first year in the war was marked by only very limited success. Following the success of an Austrian offensive from the Trentino in the spring of 1916, Salandra was forced to resign.

After World War I, Salandra moved further to the right, and supported Mussolini's accession to power in 1922. Nine years later he died in Rome.

He was awarded Order of Karađorđe's Star.

Works
He is the author of a considerable number of works on economics, finance, history, law, and politics (New International Encyclopedia).  These include:

 Tratto della giustizia amministrativo (1904)
 La politica nazionale e il partito liberale (1912)
 Lezioni di diritto amministrativo (two volumes, 1912)
 Politica e legislazione :  saggi, raccolti da Giustino Fortunato (1915)
 Il discorso contro la malafede tedesca (1915)
  Italy and the Great War: From Neutrality to Intervention (London: Edward Arnold, 1932),

See also
 Italian entry into World War I
 Radiosomaggismo

References

Further reading
 Bosworth, Richard J.B. Italy the Least of the Great Powers: Italian Foreign Policy Before the First World War (2005).
 Clark, Martin. Modern Italy: 1871 to the present (2008).
 Lowe, Cedric J. "Britain and Italian Intervention, 1914–1915." Historical Journal 12.3 (1969): 533-548.
 Mack Smith, Denis (1997). Modern Italy: A Political History, (Univ. of Michigan Press, 1997). 
 Renzi, William A. In the Shadow of the Sword: Italy's Neutrality and Entrance into the Great War, 1914-1915 (1987).
 Salandra, Antonio. Italy and the Great War: From Neutrality to Intervention (London: Edward Arnold, 1932), a primary source.
 Sarti, Roland (2004). Italy: a reference guide from the Renaissance to the present, New York: Facts on File Inc.,

External links
 
 

1853 births
1931 deaths
People from Troia, Apulia
Kingdom of the Two Sicilies people
Historical Right politicians
Italian Liberal Party politicians
Prime Ministers of Italy
Italian Ministers of the Interior
Finance ministers of Italy
Deputies of Legislature XVI of the Kingdom of Italy
Deputies of Legislature XVII of the Kingdom of Italy
Deputies of Legislature XVIII of the Kingdom of Italy
Deputies of Legislature XIX of the Kingdom of Italy
Deputies of Legislature XX of the Kingdom of Italy
Deputies of Legislature XXI of the Kingdom of Italy
Deputies of Legislature XXII of the Kingdom of Italy
Deputies of Legislature XXIII of the Kingdom of Italy
Deputies of Legislature XXIV of the Kingdom of Italy
Deputies of Legislature XXV of the Kingdom of Italy
Deputies of Legislature XXVI of the Kingdom of Italy
Deputies of Legislature XXVII of the Kingdom of Italy
Politicians of Apulia
Italian male writers
19th-century Italian lawyers
Academic staff of the Sapienza University of Rome
Italian people of World War I